This is an episode list for the TV series The Roy Rogers Show.

Series overview

Episodes

Season 1 (1951–52)

Season 2 (1952–53)

Season 3 (1953–54)

Season 4 (1954–55)

Season 5 (1955–56)

Season 6 (1956–57)

External links

Roy Rogers